The Steubenville Stampede was an indoor football franchise, most recently a member of the Continental Indoor Football League. They played their home games at the St. John Arena in Steubenville, Ohio, United States.

2006 season

The team began play in 2006 as an expansion member of the American Indoor Football League. On March 4, 2006, the Stampede lost their inaugural home-opener 21-14 against the Johnstown Riverhawks, which became the lowest scoring game in the AIFL's two-year existence.

The inaugural season roster was notable for having two future murderers. Both Thunder Collins and Bobby Cutts Jr. were active players during the season. Each were both convicted of murder for separate incidents that took place after their time with the team.

2007 season

After the 2006 season, the team decided to move to the CIFL. The Stampede were sold to Summit County Rumble owner Ramone Davenport in January 2007.

The team, although starting the season 4-0, were struggling business-wise, and at one point almost folded, but later on were purchased by Martin D. Maiuri and finished the season. Unfortunately, the team would only win one of their remaining eight games, finishing the season 5-7 and two games out of the playoffs.

Finally, on June 28, 2007, the CIFL took over and ceased operations of the Steubenville and Summit County franchises.

Season-By-Season

|-
| colspan="6" align="center" | Steubenville Stampede (AIFL)
|-
|2006 || 1 || 11 || 0 || 7th Northern || Only games played (1-1 in forfeits)
|-
| colspan="6" align="center" | Steubenville Stampede (CIFL)
|-
|2007 || 5 || 7 || 0 || 5th Atlantic || --
|-
!Totals || 6 || 18 || 0

2006 Season Schedule

Only 12 games played on field. One forfeit win and one forfeit loss not included

2007 Season Schedule

2007 CIFL Standings

References

External links
 Stampede's 2006 AIFL Season & Results

Former Continental Indoor Football League teams
American Indoor Football Association teams
American Indoor Football League teams
Defunct American football teams in Ohio
Steubenville, Ohio
American football teams established in 2005
American football teams disestablished in 2007
2005 establishments in Ohio
2007 disestablishments in Ohio